Pune–Amravati Express was an intercity train of the Indian Railways connecting  and  of Maharashtra. It was  being operated with 11405/11406 train numbers.This train was permanently cancelled in ZBTT.

Service

The 11405/Pune–Amravati Express has an average speed of 48 km/hr and covers 830 km in 17 hrs 20 mins. 11406/Amravati–Pune Express has an average speed of 44 km/hr and 830 km in 18 hours 45 minutes.

Route and halts 

The important halts of the train are:

 
 
 
 
 
 
 
 
 
 
 
Basmat
Hingoli Deccan
Washim

Coach composition

The train has standard ICF rakes with max speed of 110 k/hr. The train consists of 16 coaches:

 1 AC II Tier
 2 AC III Tier
 5 Sleeper coaches
 6 General
 2 Second-class Luggage/parcel van

Traction

Both trains are hauled by a Pune Loco Shed-based WDM-3D or WDM-3A diesel locomotive from Pune to Amravati and vice versa.

Direction reversal

Train reverses its direction 3 times:

Rake share 

The train shares its rake with Pune–Lucknow Express

Notes

External links 

 11405/Pune–Amravati Express
 11406/Amravati–Pune Express

References 

Express trains in India
Rail transport in Maharashtra
Transport in Amravati
Transport in Pune
Railway services introduced in 2013